Juglanin is a flavonol found in Polygonum aviculare.

See also 
 Juglanin A, juglanin B and juglanin C, diarylheptanoids found in several species in the genus Juglans

References 

Flavonols
Arabinosides
Hydroxymethyl compounds